Millerovsky (masculine), Millerovskaya (feminine), or Millerovskoye (neuter) may refer to:

Millerovsky District, a district of Rostov Oblast, Russia
Millerovskoye Urban Settlement, an administrative division and a municipal formation which the town of Millerovo in Millerovsky District of Rostov Oblast, Russia is incorporated as

See also
 Millerovo